The Cheon Wang Bong-class tank landing ship (Hangul: 천왕봉급 전차상륙함, Hanja: 天王峰級戰車上陸艦) is an amphibious landing ship class of the Republic of Korea Navy.

Development 
In the late 1980s the Republic of Korea Navy decided to gradually replace its aging fleet of World War II-era s (renamed Un Bong-class LST) purchased from the US Navy in 1958. A three phase plan was laid out to develop new landing ships to meet the demands of modern amphibious and transport operations.

The first phase was designated as the LST-I project, and development and design started in 1987 by Korea Tacoma, currently Hanjin Heavy Industries. After 4 years of development, the lead ship Go Jun Bong (LST-681) was launched in 1991. Three more ships followed and all four ships were commissioned by 1998.

The second phase, or LST-II, was originally planned to import four s, but after being postponed due to budget issues, it was changed in favor for domestic built 4500-ton LPDs to be commissioned by 2013-2016. After the construction of the first vessel, a follow-on contract for four additional vessels were awarded to Hyundai Heavy Industries in December 2013.

Ships in the class

References

External links

 
Landing craft
Amphibious warfare vessel classes
Amphibious warfare vessels of South Korea
Amphibious warfare vessels of the Republic of Korea Navy